Narciso may refer to:

Given name
 Narciso Clavería y de Palacios, Spanish architect
 Narciso Clavería y Zaldúa, Governor General of the Philippines
 Narciso dos Santos, Brazilian former footballer
 Narciso Durán, Franciscan friar and missionary
 Narciso López, Venezuelan adventurer
 Narciso Mina, Ecuadorian footballer
 Narciso Rodriguez, American fashion designer
 Narciso Ramos, Filipino journalist
 Narciso Vernizzi, Brazilian sports journalist
 Narciso Yepes, Spanish classical guitarist

Surname
 Antonio Narciso, Italian footballer
 Frederick Narciso, American poker player

Other
Narciso (opera), an opera by Domenico Scarlatti
Narciso (drag queen), Italian drag queen

See also
Chicho, Spanish nickname sometimes used for people called Narciso

Italian-language surnames
Spanish masculine given names